Mariusz Rumak (born 3 June 1977 in Drawsko Pomorskie) is a Polish football manager. He was most recently in the charge of Poland U19.

Career
On 27 February 2012, he signed with Ekstraklasa club Lech Poznań as senior team manager.

References

1977 births
Living people
Polish football managers
Lech Poznań managers
Śląsk Wrocław managers
People from Drawsko Pomorskie
Sportspeople from West Pomeranian Voivodeship